An N95 filtering facepiece respirator, commonly abbreviated N95 respirator, is a particulate-filtering facepiece respirator that meets the U.S. National Institute for Occupational Safety and Health (NIOSH) N95 classification of air filtration, meaning that it filters at least 95% of airborne particles. This standard does not require that the respirator be resistant to oil; another standard, P95, adds that requirement. The N95 type is the most common particulate-filtering facepiece respirator. It is an example of a mechanical filter respirator, which provides protection against particulates but not against gases or vapors. An authentic N95 respirator is marked with the text "NIOSH" or the NIOSH logo, the filter class ("N95"), a "TC" approval number of the form XXX-XXXX, the approval number must be listed on the NIOSH Certified Equipment List (CEL) or the NIOSH Trusted-Source page, and it must have headbands instead of ear loops.

The N95 mask filter was invented by Taiwanese-American Peter Tsai and his team, and received its U.S. patent in 1995. N95 respirators are considered similar to other respirators regulated under non-U.S. jurisdictions, but slightly different criteria are used to certify their performance, such as the filter efficiency, test agent and flow rate, and permissible pressure drop. For example, FFP2 respirators of the European Union are required to meet at least 94% filtration, and KN95 respirators of China are expected to meet at least 95% filtration. However, NIOSH found that some products labeled "KN95" failed to meet these standards, some of them filtering out as little as one percent. Both the U.S. Food and Drug Administration and Health Canada require such KN95 products failing to meet the filtration standards to be re-labeled as "face masks" instead of "respirators", when being sold in the U.S. and Canada.

The N95 respirator requires a fine mesh of synthetic polymer fibers, specifically a nonwoven polypropylene fabric. It is produced by melt blowing and forms the inner filtration layer that filters out hazardous particles.

Use 

Fit testing is a critical component to a respiratory protection program whenever workers use tight-fitting respirators. OSHA (US) requires an initial respirator fit test to identify the right model, style, and size respirator for each worker; as well, as annual fit tests. Additionally, tight-fitting respirators, including the N95, require a user seal check each time one is put on. Facial hair at the sealing area of the respirator will cause it to leak.

Respirators require a medical evaluation before use because they can make breathing more difficult. Some conditions that could prevent respirator use include heart conditions, lung disease, and psychological conditions such as claustrophobia. In the United States medical evaluation is required once, prior to initial fit testing and use, although it may need to be repeated if any adverse signs or symptoms are observed. Correct use of the respirator decreases the chances of airborne contamination by viruses.

For persons who are medically disqualified from negative-pressure respirators, or who cannot pass a fit test due to facial hair or other reasons, a powered air-purifying respirator is a possible alternative.

In industry 
N95 respirators were originally designed for industrial use in sectors such as mining, construction, and painting. They have also been shown to be effective as protection against engineered nanoparticles.

According to the NIOSH Respirator Selection Logic, respirators with filters in the N, R, and P series are recommended for concentrations of hazardous particulates that are greater than the relevant occupational exposure limit but less than the immediately dangerous to life or health level and the manufacturer's maximum use concentration, subject to the respirator having a sufficient assigned protection factor.

N series respirators, including the N95 respirator, are only effective in the absence of oil particles, such as lubricants, cutting fluids, or glycerine. For substances hazardous to the eyes, a respirator equipped with a full facepiece, helmet, or hood is recommended. They are not effective during firefighting, in oxygen-deficient atmosphere, or in an unknown atmosphere; in these situations a self-contained breathing apparatus is recommended instead. They are not effective against hazardous gases or vapors, for which a cartridge respirator is recommended.

In industrial settings where infectious disease exposure is not a concern, users can wear and reuse a filtering facepiece respirator until it is damaged, soiled, or causing noticeably increased breathing resistance, unless there is a manufacturer-specified duration of use. However, in laboratories at biosafety level 2 and higher, respirators are recommended to be discarded as hazardous waste after a single use.

Some industrial N95 series respirators have an exhaust valve to improve comfort, making exhalation easier, reducing leakage on exhalation and steaming-up of glasses. It was previously believed that if the exhalation air from those respirators was not filtered, then an additional well-fitting cloth facemask or other exhalation filter needed to be used with the respirator for source control to prevent the spread of disease, such as COVID-19, when worn by asymptomatic, but possibly infected users. Newer research indicates that source control of valved respirators can be "similar to or better than those provided by surgical masks and unregulated barrier face coverings." According to the CDC, the "study also shows that modifications [such as the use of an electrocardiogram pad or surgical tape secured over the valve from the inside of the FFR] [...] can further reduce particle emissions." The CDC recommends that "In general, individuals wearing NIOSH-approved N95s with an exhalation valve should not be asked to use one without an exhalation valve or to cover it with a face covering or mask."

In healthcare

Respirators used in healthcare are traditionally a specific variant called a surgical respirator, which is both approved by NIOSH as a respirator and cleared by the Food and Drug Administration as a medical device similar to a surgical mask. These may also be labeled  "Surgical N95", "medical respirators", or "healthcare respirators". The difference lies in the extra fluid-resistant layer outside, typically colored blue. As part of the Families First Coronavirus Response Act, changes were made to liability and certification laws to allow industrial respirators to be used in healthcare settings, in response to shortages of respirators during the COVID-19 pandemic.

In the United States, the Occupational Safety and Health Administration (OSHA) requires healthcare workers who are expected to perform patient activities with those suspected or confirmed to be infected with COVID-19 to wear respiratory protection, such as an N95 respirator. The CDC recommends the use of respirators with at least N95 certification to protect the wearer from inhalation of infectious particles including Mycobacterium tuberculosis, avian influenza, severe acute respiratory syndrome (SARS), pandemic influenza, and Ebola.

Unlike a respirator, a surgical mask is designed to provide barrier protection against droplets and does not have an air-tight seal and thus does not protect its wearer against airborne particles such as virus material to the same extent.

Use during shortages 

During crisis situations where there is a shortage of N95 respirators, such as the COVID-19 pandemic, the U.S. Centers for Disease Control and Prevention (CDC) has recommended strategies for optimizing their use in healthcare settings. N95 respirators can be used beyond their manufacturer-designated shelf life, although components such as the straps and nose bridge material may degrade, making it particularly important that the wearer perform the expected seal check. N95 respirators can be reused a limited number of times after being removed, as long as they have not been used during aerosol-generating procedures and are not contaminated with patients' bodily fluids, because this increases the risk of surface contamination with pathogens. The respirator manufacturer may recommend a maximum number of donnings or uses; if no manufacturer guidance is available, preliminary data suggests limiting to five uses per device. Respirators approved under standards used in other countries and are similar to NIOSH-approved N95 respiratorsincluding FFP2 and FFP3 respirators regulated by the European Unioncan be used.

According to NIOSH, respirators may still be used in crisis situations if standard respirator fit testing is not available, as a respirator will still provide better protection than a surgical mask or no mask. In this case, best practices for getting a good face seal include trying different models or sizes, using a mirror or asking a colleague to check that the respirator is touching the face, and doing multiple user seal checks.

Given that the global supply of personal protective equipment (PPE) is insufficient during the pandemic, as of 2 February 2020, the World Health Organization recommends minimizing the need for PPE through telemedicine; physical barriers such as clear windows; allowing only those involved in direct care to enter a room with a COVID-19 patient; using only the PPE necessary for the specific task; continuing use of the same respirator without removing it while caring for multiple patients with the same diagnosis; monitoring and coordinating the PPE supply chain; and discouraging the use of masks for asymptomatic individuals. It should be stressed that for advice updates up until 3 July 2020, the CDC and WHO recommend individuals wear non-medical face coverings in public settings where there is an increased risk of transmission and where social distancing measures are difficult to maintain. Many countries and local jurisdictions encourage or mandate the use of face masks or cloth face coverings by members of the public to limit the spread of the virus.

When it is no longer possible for all healthcare workers to wear N95 respirators when caring for a COVID-19 patient, CDC recommends that respirators be prioritized for workers performing aerosol-generating procedures on symptomatic persons, and those within three feet of an unmasked symptomatic person. Under these conditions, masking of symptomatic patients with a surgical mask and maintaining distance from the patient are particularly important to reduce the risk of transmission. When no respirators are left, workers who are at higher risk for severe illness may be excluded from caring for patients, and workers who have clinically recovered from COVID-19 may be preferred to care for patients. Portable fans with HEPA filters may also be used to increase ventilation in isolation rooms when surgical masks are being used in place of respirators. A high-quality HEPA filter can trap 99.97% of dust particles that are 0.3 microns in diameter. If neither respirators nor surgical masks are available, as a last resort, it may be necessary for healthcare workers to use masks that have never been evaluated or approved by NIOSH or homemade masks, such as cloth face masks, although caution should be exercised when considering this option.

Decontamination 
Disposable filtering facepiece respirators such as N95 respirators are not approved for routine decontamination and reuse as standard of care. However, their decontamination and reuse may need to be considered as a crisis capacity strategy to ensure continued availability.

There have been efforts to evaluate cleaning methods for respirators in emergency shortages, although there is concern that this may reduce filter performance, or affect mask fit by deforming the mask. Duke University researchers have published a method for cleaning N95 respirators without damaging them using vaporized hydrogen peroxide to allow reuse for a limited number of times. Battelle received an Emergency Use Authorization from the U.S. Food and Drug Administration for its technology used to sterilize N95 respirators.

OSHA does not currently have any standards for disinfecting N95 respirators. NIOSH recommends that during shortages N95 respirators may be used up to five times without cleaning them, as long as aerosol-generating procedures are not performed, and respirators are not contaminated with patients' bodily fluids. Contamination can be reduced by wearing a cleanable face shield over an N95 respirator, as well as using clean gloves when donning and seal-checking a used N95 respirator and discarding the gloves immediately after. According to CDC, ultraviolet germicidal irradiation, vaporous hydrogen peroxide and moist heat showed the most promise as potential methods to decontaminate N95 respirators and other filtering facepiece respirators.

Contrast with surgical mask 

A surgical mask is a loose-fitting, disposable device that creates a physical barrier between the mouth and nose of the wearer and potential contaminants in the immediate environment. If worn properly, a surgical mask is meant to help block large-particle droplets, splashes, sprays, or splatter that may contain viruses and bacteria. Surgical masks may also help reduce exposure of the wearer's saliva and respiratory secretions to others.

A surgical mask, by design, does not filter or block very small particles in the air that may be transmitted by coughs, sneezes, or certain medical procedures. Surgical masks also do not provide complete protection from germs and other contaminants because of the loose fit between the surface of the face mask and the face. Collection efficiency of surgical mask filters can range from less than 10% to nearly 90% for different manufacturers’ masks when measured using the test parameters for NIOSH certification. However, a study found that even for surgical masks with "good" filters, 80–100% of subjects failed an OSHA-accepted qualitative fit test, and a quantitative test showed 12–25% leakage.

The U.S. Centers for Disease Control and Prevention recommends surgical masks (over no mask) in procedures where there can be an aerosol generation from the wearer, if small aerosols can produce a disease to the patient.

History 

N95 respirators have several historical predecessors. In the late 19th century, Miles Philips began using a "mundebinde" ("mouth bandage") of sterilized cloth which he refined by adapting a chloroform mask with two layers of cotton mull. Paul Berger, a Paris surgeon, likewise investigated the protective effect of masks during surgery. Another mask design was a cloth facemask by Lien-teh Wu, who was working for the Chinese Imperial Court in the autumn of 1910 during the Manchurian plague outbreak. It inspired masks used during the 1918 flu pandemic. Another predecessor was gas masks developed during World War I, which were adapted for use by miners. They were reusable but bulky and uncomfortable due to their fiberglass filters and heavy rubber construction.

Mass production of filtering facepieces was started in 1956 in the Soviet Union (the first mass-produced model was called  meaning "petal" in Russian). The air was purified with nonwoven filtering material consisting of polymeric fibres carrying a strong electrostatic charge. Respirator was used in nuclear industry (as single-used PPE), and then in other branches of economy. In about 60 years, more than 6 billion respirators were manufactured. Unfortunately, the developers overestimated the efficiency (APF 200–1000), which led to serious errors in the choice of personal protective equipment by employers.

In the 1970s, the US Bureau of Mines and NIOSH developed standards for single-use respirators, and the first single-use N95 "dust" respirator was developed by 3M and approved in 1972. 3M used a melt blowing process that it had developed decades prior and used in products such as ready-made ribbon bows and bra cups; its use in a wide array of products had been pioneered by designer Sara Little Turnbull.

Originally designed for industrial use, N95 respirators became a healthcare standard subsequent to virus-blocking technology invented by University of Tennessee professor Peter Tsai, and patented in 1995. The novel material consists of both positive and negative charges, which are able to attract particles (such as dust, bacteria and viruses) and trap at least 95% of them by polarization before the particles can pass through the mask. The anti-viral technology was first developed to prevent the spread of drug-resistant tuberculosis. Following the onset of the COVID-19 pandemic, Tsai ended his retirement to help alleviate shortages related to the COVID-19 pandemic by researching N95 mask decontamination.

Many American companies stopped producing N95 respirators in the 2000s due to litigation costs and foreign competition.

Global shortages during the COVID-19 pandemic

On January 24, 2020, Taiwan announced that it was imposing a temporary ban on the export of masks. The respirators came to be in short supply and high demand during the COVID-19 pandemic, causing price gouging and hoarding, often leading to confiscation of masks. Production of N95 respirators was limited due to constraints on the supply of nonwoven polypropylene fabric (which is used as the primary filter) as well as the cessation of exports from China.

In Canada, AMD Medicom began making masks in 1997 through an agreement with United Medical Enterprises in Atlanta, Georgia, US. Medicom added factories in Shanghai in 2002, Yilan Taiwan in 2010 and France in 2011. As the pandemic escalated, China, France and Taiwan either prohibited the export of masks, or requisitioned Medicom's output for local use. The federal government of Canada came to an agreement with Medicom to buy millions of masks over the next ten years, leading to Medicom announcing plans to open a new factory; in Montreal. Novo Textiles in British Columbia quickly acquired a surgical mask making machine, and announced plans to acquire an N95 making machine as well.

In March 2020, US President Donald Trump applied the Defense Production Act (DPA) against the American company 3M that allows the Federal Emergency Management Agency to obtain as many N95 respirators as it needs from 3M.

Also in early April 2020, the United States federal government, invoking the DPA, ordered 3M to stop exporting N95 respirators to customers in Canada and Latin America, and to keep them within the U.S. instead. However, 3M refused, citing humanitarian implications, and the possibility of backfire: "Ceasing all export of respirators produced in the United States would likely cause other countries to retaliate and do the same, as some have already done. If that were to occur, the net number of respirators being made available to the United States would actually decrease. That is the opposite of what we and the administration, on behalf of the American people, both seek."

Selected patents

See also 
List of Taiwanese inventions and discoveries
Mechanical filter (respirator)

References

External links

 Q & A—Masks and COVID-19 by the WHO
 "A Certain Type of N95 Respirator May Do More Harm Than Good" at Healthline (front valve N95 respirators only protect the wearer)

1972 introductions
Medical masks
Respirators